Lissoeme is a genus of beetles in the family Cerambycidae, containing the following species:

 Lissoeme maculata Martins & Galileo, 1998
 Lissoeme testacea Martins Chemsak & Linsley, 1966

References

Ectenessini